Putaansuu is a Finnish surname. Notable people with the surname include:

Tomi Petteri Putaansuu (Mr Lordi) (born 1974), Finnish musician and businessman
Albert Putaansuu (1899–1976), Finnish-Canadian hockey player and coach

Finnish-language surnames